Henry Wace (10 December 1836–9 January 1924) was an English Anglican priest and ecclesiastical historian who served as Principal of King's College, London, from 1883 to 1897 and as Dean of Canterbury from 1903 to 1924. He is described in the Dictionary of National Biography as "an effective administrator, a Protestant churchman of deep scholarship, and a stout champion of the Reformation settlement".

Early life and education 
Wace was born in London on 10 December 1836 and was educated at Marlborough College, Rugby School, King's College, London, and Brasenose College, Oxford (BA literae humaniores and mathematics, Honorary Fellow 1911).

Career 
He took Holy Orders and served curacies at St Luke's, Berwick Street (1861–63), St James's, Piccadilly (1863–69), and Grosvenor Chapel (1870–72). He moved to Lincoln's Inn, where he served first as Chaplain (1872–80) and later as Preacher (1880–96). He was additionally Chaplain of the Inns of Court Rifle Volunteers (1880–1908) and the Warburton Lecturer for 1896.

In 1875, he became Professor of Ecclesiastical History at King's College, London, of which he served as Principal (1883–97). He was Rector of St Michael's, Cornhill 1896–1903 and Dean of Canterbury from 1903 until his death in 1924. He is buried in the courtyard of the great cloister of the cathedral.

Writings 
He wrote, contributed to, and edited, many publications in Christian and ecclesiastical history. His best-known work, of widest application, is the Dictionary of Christian Biography and Literature to the End of the Sixth Century A.D., with an Account of the Principal Sects and Heresies, written in collaboration with William Smith.

From 1902 to 1905 he was editor of The Churchman, an evangelical Anglican academic journal.

Other accomplishments 
He delivered the Boyle Lectures in 1874 and 1875 and the Bampton Lectures at the University of Oxford in 1879. He was Select Preacher at Oxford in 1880–81 and 1907 and at Cambridge in 1876, 1891, 1903, and 1910.

He was appointed Prebendary of St Paul's Cathedral in 1881 and received the honorary freedom of the City of Canterbury in 1921. In 1922 he played an important role in the foundation of the Bible Churchmen's Missionary Society and was its Vice-President from 1923 until his death on 9 January 1924, following a road traffic accident.

Publications 
 Dictionary of Christian Biography and Literature to the End of the Sixth Century A.D., with an Account of the Principal Sects and Heresies
 The War and the Gospel: Sermons & Addresses During the Present War (1917)

References

External links 

 
 Dictionary of Christian Biography and Literature
 King's College London archives 

1836 births
1924 deaths
19th-century English Anglican priests
20th-century English Anglican priests
Academics of King's College London
Alumni of Brasenose College, Oxford
Alumni of King's College London
Anglican scholars
British historians of religion
Deans of Canterbury
Editors of Christian publications
Evangelical Anglican clergy
Historians of Christianity
Literary critics of English
People educated at Marlborough College
People educated at Rugby School
Principals of King's College London